The Magnificent Duke is the debut studio album by Scottish conceptual rock duo Marmaduke Duke, released on April 14, 2005, on Captains of Industry. The album initially had a limited run of 4000 copies. Each song has the word 'and' in the title, like "A Fox and a Cake".

Track listing
The album is split into three different sections.
When The World:
 Explodes – The heavy section which consists of tracks 1, 4, 7, 10, 13, and 16.
 Implodes – The acoustic section which consists of tracks 2, 5, 8, 11, 14, and 17.
 Corrodes – The instrumental section which consists of tracks 3, 6, 9, 12, 15, and 18.
"The Red and the Number"
"An Egyptian and an Imposter"
"Fridge and Fromage"
"The Kill and the Kure"
"A Fox and a Cake"
"Piggary and Peccary"
"The Kiss and the Consonant"
"An Imposter and a Magician"
"Paul and Alexander"
"The False and the Cinematic"
"An Eagle and an Eye"
"Coast and Guard"
"The Human and the Jigsaw"
"A Conspiracy and a Devil"
"Village and Minotaur"
"The Beaver and the Rabbit"
"A Curse and a Coyote"
"Blunder and Haggis"
 There were no singles released from the album. Only 4,000 copies were pressed in the original run. All of the original copies have the misspelling "The Kill and the Cure" (rather than the intentional misspelling "The Kill and the Kure") in the booklet.

2005 debut albums
Concept albums